Public Service Corporation may refer to:

Public Service Corporation
former name of Public Service Electric and Gas Company (PSE&G)
Public Service Railway